Malonate decarboxylase may refer to:

 Biotin-independent malonate decarboxylase, an enzyme
 Biotin-dependent malonate decarboxylase, an enzyme